Hanna Zolotarenko (?-1671), was the Hetmana of the Cossack Hetmanate by marriage to Bohdan Khmelnytsky, Hetman of Ukraine (r. 1648-1657). She had political influence, had Universial (act) made in her own name and took responsibility of the treasury.

References

Year of birth unknown
Date of death unknown
1671 deaths

17th-century Ukrainian people
People from the Cossack Hetmanate